Henrique Moura Perillo (born 8 February 1991 in Goiânia), or simply Henrique, is a Brazilian centre back who plays for club Pérez Zeledón.

Career
On 26 July 2018, Azerbaijan Premier League club Sabail FK announced the signing of Henrique Moura on a one-year contract, with the option of a second year.

References

External links
 Henrique Moura at playmakerstats.com (English version of ogol.com.br)
 Henrique Moura at Fotbolltransfers
 

Living people
1991 births
Brazilian footballers
Brazilian expatriate footballers
Association football defenders
Vila Nova Futebol Clube players
Goiás Esporte Clube players
Associação Atlética Aparecidense players
Clube do Remo players
Deportivo Saprissa players
Sabail FK players
GAIS players
Parauapebas Futebol Clube players
Campeonato Brasileiro Série B players
Campeonato Brasileiro Série C players
Campeonato Brasileiro Série D players
Liga FPD players
Azerbaijan Premier League players
Superettan players
Brazilian expatriate sportspeople in Costa Rica
Brazilian expatriate sportspeople in Azerbaijan
Brazilian expatriate sportspeople in Sweden
Expatriate footballers in Costa Rica
Expatriate footballers in Azerbaijan
Expatriate footballers in Sweden
Sportspeople from Goiânia